USS Jupiter (AK-43) was an Aldebaran-class cargo ship commissioned by the U.S. Navy for service in World War II. She was responsible for delivering necessary goods and equipment to ships and stations in the war zone.

Jupiter (AK-43) was built in 1939 as SS Flying Cloud by Federal Shipbuilding & Drydock Co., Kearny, New Jersey; she was later renamed SS Santa Catalina, She was acquired by the Navy 19 June 1941; the next day renamed Jupiter; and commissioned 22 August 1942.

World War II Pacific Theatre operations 
 
Jupiter departed San Diego, California, 1 September for operations in the Pacific as the American campaign in the Solomon Islands was getting under way. From September through December she carried supplies and troops to staging areas for the Navy's first great offensive in the Pacific Ocean. She continued to discharge cargo in the Solomon Islands through the early part of 1943, bringing invaluable support to the closing phases of the Guadalcanal Campaign.

Transport of Japanese war materiel 
 
Jupiter departed Espiritu Santo 1 February, commencing a series of three cruises to San Francisco for supplies and personnel. On the first of these voyages she returned captured Japanese equipment, including a "Betty" bomber, a "Tony" fighter, and several "long lance" torpedoes.

Island invasion support 
 
The cargo ship returned to battle during the Gilbert Islands invasion late November, landing equipment to aid in the successful assault on Tarawa. Jupiter then continued cargo operations until she was assigned to the 5th Amphibious Forces in April 1944 for the Marianas campaign. She departed Pearl Harbor 30 May and arrived in the Saipan assault area 15 June. She discharged her cargo despite constant enemy air attack and 10 days later proceeded toward Eniwetok.

Invasion of the Philippines 
 
Following a summer of amphibious rehearsals, Jupiter, under Comdr. J. M. Bristol, departed Guadalcanal 8 September to support the invasion of the Palau Islands. She unloaded her cargo without incident and returned to Manus to prepare for the important Philippine invasion. Departing Hollandia 16 October, she arrived at Leyte and commenced unloading cargo 22 October. As other units of the fleet were engaging the Japanese in the famed "Battle of Leyte Gulf", Jupiter returned to the Marianas to pick up additional material. She continued reinforcing units in the Philippines until she steamed into Ulithi 23 January 1945 to prepare for the next Campaign.
 
When continued progress along the "road to Japan" required a stop-over base for B-29 raids on Tokyo, Iwo Jima was selected. Jupiter got underway 16 February with cargo and units of the 3rd Marine Division to secure this fortified atoll. After unloading her cargo under most difficult conditions, she remained in the area until Japanese resistance had ceased 16 March.

Supplying troops on Okinawa 
 
After repairs at Pearl Harbor, Jupiter departed Hawaii on 1 May with supplies for American troops fighting for Okinawa.

End-of-war activity 

She returned to San Francisco 27 July for conversion to an aviation supply ship and was redesignated AVS-8, 31 July 1945. Following replenishment-at-sea exercises the following year, she supported outlying bases and ships until decommissioning at San Diego 23 May 1947 and joining the reserve fleet.

Reactivated during Korean War 
 
In June 1950 a new threat to world peace exploded in Asia-Communist aggression in South Korea. The United States answered this challenge by dispatching troops and supplies to the war-torn peninsula. USS Jupiter (AVS-8) recommissioned 10 October 1950 and sailed for Yokosuka, Japan, 8 January 1951. Arriving 29 January, she operated out of Japan, replenishing units fighting ashore until returning to San Francisco 11 August 1952. After operations along the U.S. West Coast, the supply ship returned to the war zone in March 1953 to supply troops and replenish carriers engaged in air strikes on the Korean peninsula. Following the cessation of hostilities, Jupiter returned to the West Coast 3 October.

Operations in the Formosa Straits 
 
Jupiter was again deployed to the Pacific in 1954 to replenish ships in the tense Formosa area. The U.S. 7th Fleet prevented any major crisis from developing, and Jupiter steamed into San Francisco 20 October 1954. She resumed her operations in the Far East March 1955; this time for an extended period. For the next 9 years (1955–63) she operated out of Yokosuka, replenishing units of the 7th Fleet, as it took on greater roles in "keeping the peace". During Jupiter's service in the Far Pacific, the 7th Fleet averted major crises in Formosa, Indonesia, and Laos; and played an important part in the Vietnam struggle.

Post-Korean War decommissioning 

She continued to carry vital supplies to the Far East until struck from the Navy List on 1 August 1965. Jupiter was then transferred to the Maritime Administration and joined the National Defense Reserve Fleet at Olympia, Washington, where she remained.  She was struck from the Naval Register, 1 August 1965.  Final disposition: sold for scrapping in March 1971.

Military awards and honors 
 
Jupiter received six battle stars for World War II:
 Capture and defense of Guadalcanal
 Gilbert Islands operation
 Marianas operation
 Leyte operation
 Iwo Jima operation
 Okinawa Gunto operation
Jupiter received seven battle stars for Korean War service:
 First UN Counter Offensive
 Communist China Spring Offensive
 UN Summer-Fall Offensive
 Second Korean Winter
 Korean Defense Summer-Fall 1952
 Third Korean Winter
 Korean Summer-Fall 1953
Her crew members were eligible for the following medals:
 American Campaign Medal
 Asiatic-Pacific Campaign Medal (6)
 World War II Victory Medal
 Navy Occupation Service Medal (with Asia clasp)
 National Defense Service Medal (2)
 Korean Service Medal (5)
 Armed Forces Expeditionary Medal (1-Congo 3-Vietnam)
 Philippines Liberation Medal (1)
 United Nations Service Medal
 Republic of Korea War Service Medal (retroactive)

References

External links 
 NavSource Online: Service Ship Photo Archive - AK-43 / AVS-8 Jupiter
 Photo gallery at Naval Historical Center
 

Type C2 ships
Ships built in Kearny, New Jersey
1939 ships
Aldebaran-class stores ships
World War II auxiliary ships of the United States